Primavera Systems, Inc was a private company providing Project Portfolio Management (PPM) software to help project-intensive organizations identify, prioritize, and select project investments and plan, manage, and control projects and project portfolios of all sizes. On January 1, 2009 Oracle Corporation took legal ownership of Primavera.

History of Primavera Systems, Inc

Corporate 
Nigel, Les Seskin and Dick Faris founded Primavera Systems, Inc. on May 1, 1983. It traded as a private company based in Pennsylvania (USA), developing software for the Project Portfolio Management market. To help expand its product capabilities, Primavera acquired Eagle Ray Software Systems in 1999, Evolve Technologies (a professional services automation vendor) in 2003, ProSight [2][3] (an IT portfolio management software vendor) in 2006, and, in the same year, Pertmaster (a project risk management software vendor).

In 2008 Oracle Corporation acquired Primavera, and turned it into its Primavera Global Business Unit (PGBU).

After a 27-year version life, Oracle ceased sales of the P3 and SureTrak versions on December 31, 2010.

In 2011, co-founder Joel Koppelman announced his retirement; Mike Sicilia, SVP and General Manager, succeeded him.  Co-founder Dick Faris has retired in December 2014 as Senior Vice President, Customers.

In 2016, the Primavera Global Business Unit became Oracle Construction and Engineering Global Business Unit (CEGBU) following multiple acquisitions, including Skire (now Primavera Unifier), Instantis (Cloud based Project Portfolio Management) and Textura (a Chicago based company offering contract management and online payment tools for the construction industry).
More recently Australian-based Aconex joined the Construction and Engineering family, offering project controls, collaboration, document management and BIM capabilities.

See also 
 Primavera (software)
 Project Portfolio Management
 Project Management

External links
 Oracle Construction and Engineering website
 Oracle Construction and Engineering blog

References 

Oracle software
Project management software
Defunct software companies of the United States
Oracle acquisitions